Roberto Buitrago Dueñas (born 13 January 1937) known as  "Pajarito" Buitrago, is a retired Colombian road racing cyclist who won the Vuelta a Colombia in 1962 with just 8 seconds over second placed finisher Martin Emilio Rodriguez. He also came second and third in the 1960 and 1961 editions of this race. Buitrago also won the King of the Mountains competition in the 1958 Vuelta a Guatemala and he competed in the team time trial at the 1960 Summer Olympics.

References

External links
 

1937 births
Living people
Colombian male cyclists
Olympic cyclists of Colombia
Cyclists at the 1960 Summer Olympics
People from Bucaramanga
Sportspeople from Santander Department
20th-century Colombian people